The second season of the American television series This Is Us continues to follow the lives and connections of the Pearson family across several time periods. The season was produced by Rhode Island Ave. Productions, Zaftig Films, and 20th Century Fox Television, with Dan Fogelman, Isaac Aptaker, and Elizabeth Berger serving as showrunners.

A second and third season of This Is Us were ordered in January 2017, with production for season two beginning that July. The season stars an ensemble cast featuring Milo Ventimiglia, Mandy Moore, Sterling K. Brown, Chrissy Metz, Justin Hartley, Susan Kelechi Watson, Chris Sullivan, Ron Cephas Jones, Jon Huertas, Alexandra Breckenridge, Niles Fitch, Logan Shroyer, Hannah Zeile, Mackenzie Hancsicsak, Parker Bates, Eris Baker, Faithe Herman, and Lonnie Chavis. 

The second season, consisting of 18 episodes, aired from September 26, 2017, to March 13, 2018, on NBC. This Is Us served as the lead-out program for Super Bowl LII in February 2018 with the second season's fourteenth episode.

Cast and characters

Main
 Milo Ventimiglia as Jack Pearson
 Mandy Moore as Rebecca Pearson
 Sterling K. Brown as Randall Pearson
 Niles Fitch as teenage Randall Pearson
 Lonnie Chavis as young Randall Pearson
 Chrissy Metz as Kate Pearson
 Hannah Zeile as teenage Kate Pearson
 Mackenzie Hancsicsak as young Kate Pearson
 Justin Hartley as Kevin Pearson
 Logan Shroyer as teenage Kevin Pearson
 Parker Bates as young Kevin Pearson
 Susan Kelechi Watson as Beth Pearson
 Chris Sullivan as Toby Damon
 Jon Huertas as Miguel Rivas
 Alexandra Breckenridge as Sophie
 Eris Baker as Tess Pearson
 Faithe Herman as Annie Pearson
 Ron Cephas Jones as William H. "Shakespeare" Hill

Recurring

 Jermel Nakia as young adult William H. "Shakespeare" Hill
 Ron Howard as himself, the director in Kevin's movie.
 Lyric Ross as Deja Andrews, Randall and Beth's foster child.
 Debra Jo Rupp as Linda, a social worker who works with Randall and Beth when they foster Deja.
 Caitlin Thompson as Madison, Kate's group's resident thin member, who Kate discovers is bulimic.
 Joy Brunson as Shauna Andrews, Deja's mother.

Guest
 Sylvester Stallone as himself, an actor in Kevin's movie.
 Peter Onorati as Stanley Pearson
 Sam Anderson as Walter Crowder, the judge in young adult William Hill's case.
 Delroy Lindo as Ernest Bradley, the judge in Randall's adoption case.
 Kate Burton as Barbara, a psychologist at Kevin's rehab who facilitates his meeting with the family.
 Garrett Morris as Lloyd, a resident of William's old apartment building.
 Iantha Richardson as adult Tess Pearson, a social worker.
 Gerald McRaney as Dr. Nathan Katowski (aka Dr. K), Rebecca's former childbirth obstetrician.
 Susan Blakely as Anne, Dr. K's wife.
 Pam Grier as G. G., Shauna's grandmother and Deja's great-grandmother.
 Dan Lauria as Mr. Damon, Toby's father.
 Wendie Malick as Mary Damon, Toby's mother.
 Melanie Liburd as Zoe Baker, Beth's cousin.

Episodes

Production

Development
On January 18, 2017, NBC renewed the series for a second and third season of 18 episodes each, for a total of 36 additional episodes. Dan Fogelman, Isaac Aptaker, and Elizabeth Berger served as the season's showrunners.

Casting
Main cast members Milo Ventimiglia, Mandy Moore, Sterling K. Brown, Chrissy Metz, Justin Hartley, Susan Kelechi Watson, Chris Sullivan, and Ron Cephas Jones returned from the first season as Jack Pearson, Rebecca Pearson, Randall Pearson, Kate Pearson, Kevin Pearson, Beth Pearson, Toby Damon, and William H. Hill, respectively. Jon Huertas and Alexandra Breckenridge, who recurred as Miguel and Sophie, respectively, throughout the first season, were subsequently promoted to the principal cast in the second season. Also promoted to series regulars are young actors Hannah Zeile as teenage Kate, Niles Fitch as teenage Randall, Logan Shroyer as teenage Kevin, Mackenzie Hancsicsak as young Kate, Parker Bates as young Kevin, Faithe Herman as Annie Pearson, and Eris Baker as Tess Pearson. Due to his conflicting role on White Famous, Lonnie Chavis (young Randall) was unable to be promoted to a series regular, but is credited with the main cast in episodes in which he appears.

In August 2017, Sylvester Stallone and Debra Jo Rupp were cast in guest starring roles.

Filming
The show was awarded over $9.9 million in tax incentives by the California Film Commission for its second season. Production on the season began on July 11, 2017, in Los Angeles.

Release

Broadcast
The second season was originally set to move to a Thursday timeslot, to anchor a new Must See TV lineup, alongside Will & Grace, Great News and Law & Order True Crime: The Menendez Murders, with NBC chairman Bob Greenblatt explaining, "While this is a bit risky, there is a bigger case to be made about redoing Thursday night. If there is one show we could move, it would be this one." However, on May 30, 2017, NBC decided to keep the series on Tuesdays at 9pm EST, allowing it a run of 10 uninterrupted original episodes in the fall.

The season aired from September 26, 2017, to March 13, 2018, on NBC in the United States, and on CTV in Canada. This Is Us served as the lead-out program for Super Bowl LII on February 4, 2018.

Reception

Critical response
The review aggregator website Rotten Tomatoes reported a 91% approval rating, with an average rating of 7.95/10, and an average episode score of 92%, based on 23 reviews. The website's consensus reads, "This is Us continues to tug at heartstrings with an emotional exploration of family that ensures viewers will want to keep the tissues close -- and their loved ones closer."

Ratings

Accolades

References

General references

External links
 
 

2017 American television seasons
2018 American television seasons
This Is Us